Kissin' Dynamite is a German heavy metal band from Burladingen and Münsingen.

History 
Kissin' Dynamite started as a school band. Since 2007, the band has worked with the Flensburg production team Elephant Music. At the end of 2007, they started sending demos to various music labels, leading to a record contract with Capitol Records / EMI in the same year. They released their debut album Steel of Swabia in 2008, and in that year also started appearing in music festivals, which included Bang Your Head.

Their second album, also produced by Elephant Music, was titled Addicted to Metal and had twelve tracks. The title track, Addicted to Metal features vocals by Udo Dirkschneider of U.D.O. for whom Kissin' Dynamite frequently opened. In March 2011, Kissin' Dynamite announced that they had started working on their third album, which would be published by their new label, AFM Records. The album was completed in 2011, and released under the title Money, Sex and Power in March 2012. As part of the launch, the band opened for L.A. Glam-Rock band Steel Panther on their Tour.

In 2014 they released the album Megalomania, followed in 2016 by Generation Goodbye, then in 2018 by Ecstacy which broke them into the top ten on the German charts for the first time.

Prior to Kissin' Dynamite, Hannes Braun achieved second place in the 2004 season of the German version of the Sat.1 show Star Search singing heavy metal at the age of 12.

Hannes Braun is also the producer of Exit Eden, and has had a relationship with Exit Eden singer Anna Brunner for years. Both lived in Flensburg from 2015 to 2019 and worked for Elephant Music. Anna Brunner and Hannes Braun have been living in Betzingen since 2020 and run their own production company.

Name 
According to guitarist Jim Müller, the band was named after the AC/DC song of the same name. During a band meeting to choose a name, Andi Schnitzer's cellphone rang, and the song was his ringtone, leading to the decision.

Band members 

 Johannes (Hannes) Braun – vocals
 Ande Braun – guitars
 Jim Müller – guitars
 Steffen Haile – bass guitar
 Andi Schnitzer – drums

Awards and nominations

Discography

References

External links 
 Official website
 

German heavy metal musical groups